Animal-made art is art created by an animal. Animal-made works of art have been created by apes, elephants, cetacea, reptiles, and bowerbirds, among other species.

Painting animals

Pigcasso the pig 

Pigcasso is a South African pig that has gained international notoriety for her abstract expressionist paintings, which have sold for thousands of dollars around the world. Pigcasso was rescued from an industrial hog farm as a piglet by her owner, Joanne Lefson, who taught her to paint using positive reinforcement techniques. Lefson uses the proceeds of the sales of Pigcasso's paintings to raise funds for her farm sanctuary in Franschhoek, South Africa.

Each of Pigcasso's works is signed by means of the artist dipping her nose-tip into beetroot ink and touching it onto the canvas.

Pigcasso and Lefson are the first non-human/human collaboration to have held an art exhibition together, which took place at the Victoria & Alfred Waterfront in Cape Town in 2018.

 Three of Pigcasso's most famous pieces are Peacock, Snowman, and Mouse, each of which sold for $5000 in 2021. A painting of Prince Harry that was sold to a Spanish buyer for over $3000 in 2021 also received global notoriety, based on its royal subject matter.

Pigcasso's most expensive work sold in December 2021 for $27000, making it the most expensive animal-made art piece ever to have been sold at the time.

Primates 

During the late 1950s biologists began to study the nature of art in humans. Theories were proposed based on observations of non-human primate paintings. Hundreds of such paintings were cataloged by Desmond Morris. Morris and his associate Tyler Harris interpreted these canvas paintings as indications of an intrinsic motivation toward abstract creativity, as expressed through an exploration of the visual field and color. Many of these painters progressed over time by expanding or contracting the area of paint coverage, the horizontal or vertical stroke relationships, and even the development of content. Such paintings were exhibited in many modern art museums during the late 1950s and early 1960s. The cultural and scientific interest in these paintings diminished steadily and little note is taken today.

The most successful chimpanzee artist is Congo (1954–1964). Morris offered him a pencil and paper at two years of age, and by the age of four, Congo had made 400 drawings and paintings. His style has been described as "lyrical abstract impressionism". Media reaction to Congo's painting abilities were mixed, although relatively positive and accepted with interest. Pablo Picasso was reportedly a "fan" of his paintings, and hung one in his studio after receiving it as a gift. In 2005 Congo's paintings were included in an auction at Bonhams alongside works by Renoir and Warhol. They sold for more than expected, while Renoir's and Warhol's did not sell. American collector Howard Hong purchased three of Congo's works for over US$25,000.

A more recent example is Pockets Warhol, a capuchin monkey from the Story Book Farm Primate sanctuary, who has been painting since 2011.

Elephants 

Elephants in captivity have been trained to paint as a form of zoo environmental and behavioural enrichment. An example of this is seen at Melbourne Zoo. However, research published in 2014 indicated that elephants gain little enrichment from the activity of painting apart from the positive reinforcement given by zookeepers during the activity.  The scientists concluded that the "benefits of this activity appear to be limited to the aesthetic appeal of these paintings to the people viewing them". The elephants draw the same painting each time and have learned to draw it line-for-line.  It has been alleged that cruelty is involved in some tourist destinations where elephants are trained to paint.

Dolphins 

In some dolphin shows, educated dolphins and beluga whales paint with brushes. The Institute for Marine Mammal Studies has taught several of its dolphins to paint.

Rabbit 

The Bini the Bunny YouTube channel contains several videos of the titular rabbit painting abstract art on small canvases, holding a brush in his mouth.

Donkey 

A painting partially made by Lolo the donkey,  (Sunset Over the Adriatic) was exhibited at the 1910 Salon des Indépendants attributed to the 'excessivist' Genoan painter Joachim-Raphaël Boronali, an invention of writer and critic Roland Dorgelès, who painted much of the painting. It sold for 400 francs and was donated by Dorgelès to the Orphelinat des Arts. The painting forms part of the permanent collection at l'Espace culturel Paul Bédu (Milly-la-Forêt).

Copyright issues 
The copyright to an artistic work is typically held by its author. In cases where the artistic work was created by an animal, intellectual property analysts Mary M. Luria and Charles Swan have argued that neither the human who provides the equipment used to create the work, nor the human who owns the animal itself (when applicable), can hold the copyright to the resulting work by the animal. In these cases, the animal's work was not an intellectual creation of the humans, and copyrights can only be held by legal persons—which an animal is not.

The question of ownership of copyright for photographs created by animals was tested in the monkey selfie case, in mid-2014. Equipment owned by nature photographer David Slater was used by a Celebes crested macaque in Tangkoko Nature Reserve in Indonesia to take a series of self-portraits. Slater claimed copyright over the image, arguing that he had set up the situation. Other individuals and organizations, however, argued that the photographs, as the work of a non-human animal (and thus not the work of a legal person), were public domain. Slater stated that the upload of the images to Wikimedia Commons, a free media repository, had cost him more than £10,000 in lost income; he unsuccessfully attempted to have the media removed.  In August 2014, the United States Copyright Office clarified their rules to explicitly state that items created by a non-human cannot be copyrighted, and lists in their examples a "photograph taken by a monkey", which would appear to reference this case.

See also

 Bowerbird displays
 Nora, a cat pianist
 Thai Elephant Orchestra
 F. D. C. Willard, a cat physicist
 Animals in art
 Infinite monkey theorem
 Pufferfish mating ritual, courtship display creating large, geometric circles in the sand

Footnotes

External links

 Conn Ó Muíneacháin, "‘Monkey Selfie’ Photographer David Slater on his Fight with Wikipedia (audio)", www.technology.ie/ August 14, 2014. —Audio file.

Animals and humans
Painting